The al-Aqsa Foundation is an international charity established in 1997. The head office of the foundation was located in Germany until it was closed by the German authorities in July 2002. The organisation is known to have local branch offices in the Netherlands, Denmark, Belgium, Sweden, Pakistan, South Africa, Yemen and elsewhere.

Aims
On its website, al-Aqsa Foundation states that it is a non-political organization “providing for the religious, cultural and social needs of the poor and needy Palestinians living within the West Bank, Gaza, Lebanon and Jordan.”

The foundation claims to be working only with “bona fide organizations that are duly registered with the appropriate local authorities.”

Al-Aqsa Foundation maintains that its work with charitable organizations and Zakaah committees is “subject to a strict funding agreement and complete accountability and transparency on how and where the money is spent.”

Ties with extremist and terrorist organizations 
Al-Aqsa foundation does not acknowledge its association with Hamas or other militant organizations. However several ties between the foundation and these organizations have been confirmed.

Al-Moayad claimed to be the personal spiritual advisor of Osama bin Laden in the 1980s, although Bin Laden allegedly issued a fatwa calling for al-Moayad’s death after being publicly criticized by the cleric.

Based on the U.S. federal indictment against al-Moayad, in 2003 the cleric traveled to Germany to meet Mohamed Alanssi, a Federal Bureau of Investigation (FBI) informant, and an FBI undercover agent. Al-Moayad was recorded by the FBI at a Frankfurt hotel while promising to funnel about $2 million to Hamas, and was eventually arrested by the German police at the request of the FBI.

The legal proceedings also describe a 2002 meeting at which the cleric provided receipts to confirm the financial support of the Yemeni branch of the Al-Aqsa Foundation to the jihadist cause.

In particular, al-Moayad provided receipts from Interpal and three other organizations. Interpal is a UK-based charity which the U.S. government has accused of supporting terrorism and the UK Charity Commission has investigated several times based on alleged links between the charity and organizations involved in terrorism, but none of the accusations have been substantiated. Interpal is a member of the Union of Good, an umbrella organization consisting of over 50 Islamic charities and funds which funnel money to organizations belonging to Hamas. The U.S. Office of Foreign Assets Control designated the Union of Good as a terrorist entity in 2008. However, the British High Court found it is libellous in July 2010 to state that Interpal supported Hamas. The most recent records available feature Al-Aqsa foundation and its Yemeni branch, listed as “Al-Aqsa Islamic Charitable Society Yemen,” as members of the Union of Good as well.

In general, the Al-Aqsa Foundation’s contribution to Hamas and its cause were well known to Hamas affiliates. In his book “Hamas. Politics, Charity and Terrorism in the Service of Jihad” Matthew Levitt reports that the FBI recorded a telephone conversation between Abdelhaleem Ashqar and the then-Hamas representative to Yemen Mohammed Siyam in which ali Muqbil is described as the person in charge of “charity work at the office.”

Al-Aqsa Foundation’s Swedish branch was also the conduit to channel funds from the Norway-based Islamic League to Hamas. The U.S. Treasury pointed out that at the Islamic League of Norway's annual conference held on May 18 and 19, 2002 the General Secretary of the Islamic League in Sweden reiterated the importance to support financially Al-Aqsa Foundation in Sweden, which he claimed would have contributed to the destruction of Israel.

U.S. terrorist designation
The al-Aqsa Foundation has been designated as a terrorist organization by the European Union, Australia, Canada, the UAE, the United Kingdom and the United States. The group has been described by the United States as a "critical part of Hamas' transnational terrorist support infrastructure" and has said that it "uses humanitarian relief as cover to provide support to the Hamas terrorist organization". Hamas is designated by the U.S. Secretary of State as a Foreign Terrorist Organization (66 Fed. Reg. 51088) and as Specially Designated Global Terrorist (SDGT) under Executive Order 13224, "Blocking Property and Prohibiting Transactions with Persons Who commit, Threaten to Commit, or Support Terrorism."  According to the U.S., Hamas is known to raise at least tens of millions of dollars per year throughout the world using charitable fundraising as cover.

In May 2003 the al-Aqsa Foundation was designated by the United States Department of the Treasury as a Specially Designated Global Terrorist (SDGT) entity under Executive Order 13224. As a result of this designation, all assets of the al-Aqsa Foundation are blocked and transactions with the organization are illegal. Other nations, including the Netherlands, Germany, Denmark, the United Kingdom, Luxembourg and Switzerland, have also taken action against the al-Aqsa Foundation.

Netherlands terrorist designation

On 3 April 2003, the Netherlands Minister of Foreign Affairs adopted the Sanctieregeling terrorisme 2003 (terrorism sanctions order), freezing all the funds and financial assets of Stichting Al-Aqsa, a foundation under Netherlands law describing itself as an Islamic social aid institution financially supporting various organisations in Israel, the West Bank and the Gaza Strip involved in humanitarian emergencies, on the ground that transfers of funds by Al-Aqsa were destined for organisations supporting terrorism in the Middle East, including Hamas. An application for interim measures, seeking to suspend the Sanctieregeling, was dismissed by the competent national court.

In September 2010, the General Court considered that verification of the existence of a decision of a national competent national authority is an essential precondition for the adoption of an initial Community decision to freeze funds, while verification of the action taken at national level following that decision is indispensable in the context of the adoption of a subsequent Community decision to continue the freezing of funds. In that context, the General Court found that, since repeal of the Dutch 'Sanctieregeling' in, neither the Sanctieregeling nor the order on the application for interim measures, the legal effects of which depend on the existence of the Sanctieregeling, may validly serve as the basis for a Community measure freezing Al-Aqsa’s funds. The Council should have held that there was no longer any “substratum” in national law justifying to a sufficient legal standard the maintenance of the Community measure. Therefore, the General Court annulled the contested measures in so far as they concern Al-Aqsa.

Offices
Head office:
Aachen, Germany

Branch offices:
Rotterdam, Netherlands
Copenhagen, Denmark
Brussels, Belgium
San‘a’, Yemen
Malmö, Sweden (see Al Aqsa Spannmål Stiftelse)
Johannesburg, South Africa
Islamabad, Pakistan

External links 

The Court of First Instance annuls the Council decisions ordering Jose Maria Sison and Stichting Al-Aqsa’s funds to be frozen in the fight against terrorism. EU PRESS RELEASE No° 47/07, 11 July 2007
DELISTING Entity STICHTING AL AQSA. Isle of Man Government, 14 April 2014
April 11, 2014: EU, HMT delist STICHTING AL AQSA. Mr. Watchlist, 14 April 2014

References

Foundations based in Germany
Hamas
Islamic organisations based in Germany
Organizations based in Europe designated as terrorist
Organisations designated as terrorist by the European Union
Union of Good
Temple Mount